Anselmo Llorente is a district of the Tibás canton, in the San José province of Costa Rica.

History 
Anselmo Llorente was created on 8 January 1953 by Decreto Ejecutivo 1.

Geography 
Anselmo Llorente has an area of  km² and an elevation of  metres.

Demographics 

For the 2011 census, Anselmo Llorente had a population of  inhabitants.

Transportation

Road transportation 
The district is covered by the following road routes:
 National Route 32
 National Route 39
 National Route 101
 National Route 102
 National Route 117

References 

Districts of San José Province
Populated places in San José Province